is a railway station in the city of Tōkai, Aichi Prefecture, Japan, operated by Meitetsu.

Lines

Station layout
The station has two opposed  side platforms connected by a footbridge. The station has automated ticket machines, Manaca automated turnstiles and is unattended.

Platforms

Adjacent stations

Station history
The Aichi Electric Railway became part of the Meitetsu group on August 1, 1935; however, the station was closed in 1944. On August 17, 1964, the station was reopened as  after the nearby Tōkai Steel plant. The station named changed to  when Tōkai was absorbed into Fuji Steel on August 1, 1967, and then to its present name on March 31, 1970 when Fuji co-founded Nippon Steel. The station has been unattended since March 2002. In January 2005, the Tranpass system of magnetic fare cards with automatic turnstiles was implemented.

Passenger statistics
In fiscal 2017, the station was used by an average of 1889 passengers daily.

Surrounding area
This station provides access to Seijoh University, although the name comes from the nearby Nippon Steel plant.

See also
 List of railway stations in Japan

References

External links

 Official web page 

Railway stations in Aichi Prefecture
Railway stations in Japan opened in 1912
Stations of Nagoya Railroad
Tōkai, Aichi